The Livoberezhna line is the second line of the Kyiv Light Rail, located in the eastern part of Kyiv. The tram corridor was opened on May 26, 2000, rebuilt from 2010 to 2012, and reopened again on October 25, 2012. Trams No 4 and No 5 run along the Livoberezhna Line.

At one point, the Kyiv City Administration proposed extending the Kyiv Metro system to Troieschyna by creating the Livoberezhna Line, although this proposal was scrapped in 2014 in favor of keeping the light rail system.

List of stations
The Livoberezhna Line consists of a total of seven full stations, served by routes No 4 and No 5. The line is serviced by the Darnytsia tram depot. Here is a full list of stations on the line:

References

External links
 

Kyiv Light Rail
Railway lines opened in 2000
2000 establishments in Ukraine